Maria Fearing (1838–1937) was an American teacher and missionary, most famous for her work in Congo.

Life
Maria Fearing was born in slavery near Gainesville, Alabama in 1838, to Mary and Jesse, on the Oak Hill plantation of William O. Winston, in whose home she worked as a nanny and house servant for 30 years. After the end of slavery, she learned to read and write at the age of 33. She went on to graduate from the Freedman's Bureau School in Talladega and qualified as a teacher, and worked in Anniston.

In spite of her old age of 56, she accompanied William Henry Sheppard to Africa in 1894 as a Presbyterian missionary. Rejected by the church because of her age, she  initially financed her mission primarily through funds from the sale of her home. For twenty years, she worked in the Congo as a teacher and Bible translator. She also bought many people out of slavery in the Congo. Her most famous achievement was the establishment of the Pantops Home for Girls in Luebo, Congo. She was known as mama wa Mputu, which means "Mother from far away". Despite the church's skepticism, Fearing outlasted many of her colleagues in Africa and only retired from missionary service in 1915 due to age restrictions. She taught school in Selma, Alabama, until her death in 1937 at the age of 99.

Legacy
After her death, her fame was spread to many Alabama schoolchildren, both white and black, through the inclusion of her life story in Alabama history textbooks during the turbulent days of the 1960s. She was inducted into the Alabama Women's Hall of Fame in 2000.

References

External links
 https://web.archive.org/web/20090317074632/http://www.archives.state.al.us///afro/maria.html

African-American educators
19th-century American educators
1838 births
1937 deaths
People from Sumter County, Alabama
American Presbyterian missionaries
Presbyterian missionaries in the Democratic Republic of the Congo
American expatriates in the Congo Free State
African-American schoolteachers
African-American missionaries
Congo Free State people
Female Christian missionaries
Missionary educators
Schoolteachers from Alabama
19th-century American women educators